Lizan Mitchell is a film, Broadway, and television actress known for her roles in the films The Preacher's Wife and The Human Stain. She has also played television roles such as Clara in Unbreakable Kimmy Schmidt and Guiding Light.

On film, she was seen in Brother to Brother (2004) and The Final Patient (2005).

Awards 
She has received the Helen Hayes Award for Outstanding Lead Actress, Non-Resident Production.

References

American film actresses
American television actresses
Living people
Year of birth missing (living people)
21st-century American women